
Gmina Pokrzywnica is a rural gmina (administrative district) in Pułtusk County, Masovian Voivodeship, in east-central Poland.

Villages
Gmina Pokrzywnica contains the villages and settlements of Budy Ciepielińskie, Budy Obrębskie, Budy Pobyłkowskie, Ciepielin, Dzbanice, Dzierżenin, Gzowo, Karniewek, Kępiaste, Klaski, Klusek, Koziegłowy, Łępice, Łosewo, Łubienica, Łubienica-Superunki, Mory, Murowanka, Niestępowo Włościańskie, Nowe Niestępowo, Obręb, Obrębek, Olbrachcice, Piskornia, Pobyłkowo Duże, Pobyłkowo Małe, Pogorzelec, Pokrzywnica, Pomocnia, Strzyże, Świeszewo, Trzepowo, Witki, Wólka Zaleska and Zaborze.

Neighbouring gminas
Gmina Pokrzywnica is bordered by the gminas of Pułtusk, Serock, Winnica and Zatory.

References

External links
Polish official population figures 2006

Pokrzywnica
Pułtusk County